The 1995–96 ECHL season was the eighth season of the ECHL.  Before the season started, the Greensboro Monarchs franchise moved up to the American Hockey League and became the Carolina Monarchs.  The league saw the addition of four new teams for the 1995–96 season, which included the relocation of the Louisville IceHawks to Jacksonville, FL and expansion franchises in Laffayette, LA and Mobile, AL, as well as a return to Louisville, KY, bringing the number of teams in the league to twenty-one.  With the increase in the number of teams the league decided to increase the number of games played in the regular season from 68 to 70.  The Richmond Renegades finished first overall in the regular season, winning the Brabham Cup and the Charlotte Checkers won their first Riley Cup sweeping the Jacksonville Lizard Kings in four games.

Regular season
Note: GP = Games played, W = Wins, L = Losses, SOL = Shootout losses, Pts = Points, GF = Goals for, GA = Goals against, Green shade = Clinched playoff spot, Blue shade = Clinched division

Riley Cup playoffs

Bracket

ECHL awards

References
All stats come from Internet Hockey Database

See also
 ECHL
 ECHL All-Star Game
 Kelly Cup
 List of ECHL seasons

ECHL seasons
ECHL season, 1995-96